Zaraqan may refer to:
Zarağan, Azerbaijan
Zarqan, Razavi Khorasan, Iran